Damdingiin Zul (born 16 February 1973) is a Mongolian boxer. He competed in the men's light heavyweight event at the 1992 Summer Olympics.

References

External links
 

1973 births
Living people
Mongolian male boxers
Olympic boxers of Mongolia
Boxers at the 1992 Summer Olympics
Place of birth missing (living people)
Light-heavyweight boxers
20th-century Mongolian people